Fernando Zapata (born 15 August 1973) is an Argentine rower. He competed in the men's lightweight double sculls event at the 1996 Summer Olympics.

References

1973 births
Living people
Argentine male rowers
Olympic rowers of Argentina
Rowers at the 1996 Summer Olympics
Place of birth missing (living people)